Anne Šaraškin (until 1964 Anne Ronk; born 19 January 1938) is an Estonian figure skater and referee.

She was born in Pajusi Rural Municipality, Viljandi County. In 1961 she graduated from Tallinn Pedagogical Institute as a mathematics-physics teacher.

She began her figure skating career in 1952, coached by Benita Parri. Later her coach was Ly Piir. 1963-1969 he won Estonian championships in pair ice dance, and in 1956 in single ice dance.

1975–2010 she was a member of the board of Estonian Skating Union.

References

Living people
1938 births
Estonian female figure skaters
Tallinn University alumni
People from Põltsamaa Parish